Ibrahim al-Laqqani was a mufti of Maliki law, a scholar of Hadith, a scholar of theology and author of one of the most popular didactic poems on Ash'ari theology (Jawharat at-Tawhid) which became the subject of numerous commentaries and glossaries. One such was by his son 'Abd al-Salam al-Laqani.

Al-Laqani studied under notable Hanafi, Maliki and Shafi'i scholars, but only issued fatwas in the Maliki school. He was also a professor at al-Azhar university of Cairo. and wrote on many subjects including Hadith and Arabic grammar.

References

Asharis
Maliki fiqh scholars
17th-century Arabs